Zouk Mosbeh (Arabic: زوق مصبح) is a town and municipality in the Keserwan District of the  Keserwan-Jbeil Governorate in Lebanon. It is located 12 kilometers north of Beirut. Zouk Mosbeh's average elevation is 170 meters above sea level and its total land area is 453 hectares. Its inhabitants are predominantly Maronite Catholics and Christians from other denominations. There are three schools in the town, one public and two private, which together enrolled a total of 4,633 students in 2005–2006. There were 167 businesses with over five employees operating in Zouk Mosbeh as of 2006.

Zouk Mosbeh is well known for a cave called the King's Cave and is home to the Notre Dame University – Louaize. The town is home to the Hall of Fame Museum which contains fifty silicone models of famous celebrities, and several of them are animated. It is also home to the Christ the King Convent and the base of the Association for the Protection of the Lebanese Heritage.

History
In 1838, Eli Smith noted  Zuk Musbah as a village located in Aklim el-Kesrawan, Northeast of Beirut; the chief seat of the Maronites.

Industrial Zone
The city is known for its industrial zone which contains numerous shops. It has been hit with an explosion in 2007 causing one death and 3 injuries, but was rebuilt and started operating properly since then.

References

Bibliography

External links
 Photographs of the King's Cave, Zouk Mosbeh
 Christ The King Convent, Zouk Mosbeh - Wikimapia

Populated places in Keserwan District
Maronite Christian communities in Lebanon